Dr. Vincent Žuk-Hryškievič (sometimes Vintsent Zhuk-Hryshkevich, ; February 10, 1903 – February 14, 1989) was a Belarusian emigre politician.

Vincent Žuk-Hryškievič studied at a Belarusian gymnasium in Budsłaŭ and then, after the gymnasium's closure, in the Belarusian Gymnasium of Vilnia from which he graduated in 1922.

He graduated from the Charles University in Prague in 1926 and worked in 1927-1939 as a teacher in the Belarusian Gymnasium of Vilnia, while also taking part in Belarusian activities in West Belarus, including work for a newspaper published by the Belarusian Peasants' and Workers' Union.

In late September 1939, after the Soviet invasion of Poland, Vincent Žuk-Hryškievič was first appointed editor in a Soviet newspaper but very soon arrested by the NKVD. After several months of tortures, he was sent to Gulag concentration camps in Kotlas and Vorkuta.

In 1942 he was set free as a Polish citizen and fought in the Anders' Army in Egypt and Italy, including the Battle of Monte Cassino.

After the war, Žuk-Hryškievič first settled in the United Kingdom where together with other Belarusian veterans of the Anders Army he became one of the founders of the Association of Belarusians in Great Britain.

In 1950, he moved to Canada and actively participated in Belarusian activities in North America as one of the leaders of the Belarusian Canadian Alliance. In 1952, he became a Ph.D. in Literature at the University of Ottawa.

For a period of two years he moved to Munich, West Germany, at the invitation of President Mikoła Abramčyk. Here he established and managed the Belarusian section of Radio Liberty. He made the first broadcast to his homeland on May 20, 1954, and remained with the programme until April 1956 when he returned to Toronto.

Vincent Žuk-Hryškievič was president of the government-in-exile of the Belarusian Democratic Republic between 1970 and 1980.

External links 
 Першы партал Нарачанскага краю - Вінцэнт Жук-Грышкевіч
 Калекцыя Раісы Жук-Грышкевіч у IHRC University of Minnesota

References

1903 births
1989 deaths
People from Myadzyel District
People from Vileysky Uyezd
Belarusian Roman Catholics
Members of the Rada of the Belarusian Democratic Republic
Belarusian emigrants to the United Kingdom
Belarusian emigrants to Canada
Charles University alumni
Radio Free Europe/Radio Liberty people
Belarusian journalists
Polish military personnel of World War II
Foreign Gulag detainees
20th-century journalists